John Halkett was a Scottish footballer who played in the Scottish League for Dundee as an outside left.

Personal life 
Halkett's younger brother Alex was also a footballer.

Career statistics

References 

Scottish footballers
Dundee F.C. players
Scottish Football League players
Year of birth missing
Year of death missing
Place of birth missing
Association football outside forwards